Neocollyris restricta is a species of ground beetle in the genus Neocollyris in the subfamily Carabinae. It was described by Naviaux in 2008.

References

Restricta, Neocollyris
Beetles described in 2008